The 2016 Wofford Terriers football team represented Wofford College in the 2016 NCAA Division I FCS football season. They were led by 29th-year head coach Mike Ayers and played their home games at Gibbs Stadium. They were a member of the Southern Conference. They finished the season 10–4, 6–2 in SoCon play to finish in a tie for second place. They received an at-large bid to the FCS playoffs where they defeated Charleston Southern and The Citadel in the first and second round, before losing to Youngstown State in the quarterfinals.

Schedule

Source: Schedule

Ranking movements

References

Wofford
Wofford Terriers football seasons
Wofford
Wofford Terriers football